This is a list of newspapers in Kansas.

Daily newspapers
This is a list of daily newspapers currently published in Kansas. For weekly newspapers, see List of newspapers in Kansas.

 The Abilene Reflector-Chronicle – Abilene
 Atchison Daily Globe – Atchison
 Augusta Daily Gazette – Augusta
 The Chanute Tribune – Chanute
 Clay Center Dispatch – Clay Center
 Columbus News-Report – Columbus
 Council Grove Republican - Council Grove
 The Cowley Courier Traveler – Arkansas City 
 The Daily Union – Junction City
 Dodge City Daily Globe – Dodge City
 The El Dorado Times – El Dorado
 Emporia Gazette – Emporia
 Fort Scott Tribune – Fort Scott
 Garden City Telegram – Garden City
 Great Bend Tribune – Great Bend
 Hays Daily News – Hays
 The Hutchinson News – Hutchinson
 Independence Daily Reporter - Independence
 Lawrence Journal-World – Lawrence
 Leavenworth Times – Leavenworth
 The Manhattan Mercury – Manhattan
 McPherson Sentinel – McPherson
 The Morning Sun – Pittsburg
 The Newton Kansan – Newton
 The Olathe News – Olathe
 Ottawa Herald – Ottawa
 Parsons Sun — Parsons
 Shawnee Mission Post - Northern Johnson County
 The Salina Journal – Salina
 The Topeka Capital-Journal – Topeka
 The Wichita Eagle – Wichita<noinclude>

Weekly newspapers
 Anderson County Advocate – Garnett
 Anderson County Review – Garnett
 The Anthony Republican – Anthony
 Baldwin City Gazette – Baldwin City
 Basehor Sentinel – Basehor
 The Belle Plaine News – Belle Plaine
 The Belleville Telescope – Belleville
 The Coffeyville Journal – Coffeyville
 The Colby Free Press – Colby
 The Community Voice - Wichita, Kansas
 Concordia Blade-Empire – Concordia
 Conway Springs Star & Argonia Argosy – Conway Springs
 The Courier-Tribune (Kansas) – Seneca
 The Courtland Journal - Courtland
 The Cunningham Courier - Cunningham
 The De Soto Explorer – De Soto
 The Derby Informer – Derby
 Downs News & Times – Downs
 The Eudora News – Eudora
 The Eureka Herald – Eureka
 Farm Talk Newspaper – Parsons
 The Fort Leavenworth Lamp – Fort Leavenworth
 Garden City Telegram – Garden City
 Hays Post – Hays (online only)
 Haysville Sun-Times – Haysville
 The Herington Times - Herington
 Hiawatha World – Hiawatha
 High Plains Journal – Dodge City
 Hillsboro Free Press – Hillsboro
 Hillsboro Star-Journal – Hillsboro
 The Holton Recorder – Holton
 Hometown Girard – Girard
 The Humboldt Union - Humboldt
 The Hype Weekly (alternative weekly newspaper) - Manhattan
 The Iola Register – Iola
 The Jackson County Journal - Holton
 Kansas City Kansan – Kansas City (online only)
 Labette Avenue - Oswego
 Kiowa County Signal – Greensburg
 The Kiowa News – Kiowa
 Larned Tillers & Toiler – Larned
 Marion County Record – Marion
 Marysville Advocate – Marysville
 Montgomery County Chronicle – Caney
 The Mulberry Advance – Mulberry
 The Oxford Register – Oxford
 Peabody Gazette-Bulletin – Peabody
 The Pratt Tribune – Pratt
 Prairie Star – Sedan
 The Rush County News – La Crosse
 The Sentinel-Times – Galena
 St John News – St. John
 The Times-Sentinel – Cheney
 The Topeka Plaindealer - Topeka
 Wamego Smoke Signal - Wamego
 The Wellington Daily News - Wellington (prints once per week but maintains "Daily" in the name)

University newspapers
 Advocate - Kansas City Kansas Community College
 The Bulletin - Emporia State University
 The Campus - Ottawa University
 the Collegio - Pittsburg State University
 Kansas State Collegian - Kansas State University
 The Baker Orange - Baker University
 The Sunflower - Wichita State University
 University Daily Kansan - University of Kansas
 The University Leader - Fort Hays State University

Defunct newspapers
 The Arkansas City Traveler – Arkansas City (Now combined into the Cowley Courier Traveler)
 Atchison Champion - Atchison
 Baldwin City Signal - Baldwin City
 The Bonner Springs-Edwardsville Chieftain – Bonner Springs
 Enterprise–Chronicle – Burlingame – vol. 26 in 1921
 The Girard Press – Girard
 Herald of Freedom - Lawrence
 Kansas Free State - Lawrence
 Lawrence Republican – Lawrence – vol. 3 in 1859–60
 The Winfield Daily Courier – Winfield (Now combined into the Cowley Courier Traveler)

See also

References

External links
 
 Kansas Press Association - has a full list of daily and weekly newspapers that are KPA members.
 . (Survey of local news existence and ownership in 21st century)